Matthew Jones (born 4 April 1984) is a Welsh international rugby union player. A fly-half, he played for the Ospreys and the Wales Under-21 team, figuring in the Grand Slam winning side. In 2005 he was part of the senior Wales squad summer tour of North America and attained his first full cap against Canada.

On 23 April 2013 Bristol Confirmed that Matthew Jones as well as others players would be released at the end of the 2012–13 season.

Jones suffered a knee injury in August 2006. After a brief spell at Moseley he moved to London Welsh.

He joined Worcester Warriors in July 2008. In May 2010 Jones joined Newport Gwent Dragons. In January 2012, Jones joined Bristol, and then in 2013 he moved to Coventry R.F.C. Jones returned to Wales in 2016 becoming a player-coach for Pontypool RFC.

References

External links
Worcester Warriors profile
Newport Gwent Dragons profile
Wales profile

1984 births
Living people
Rugby union players from Bridgend
Ospreys (rugby union) players
Worcester Warriors players
Dragons RFC players
Newport RFC players
Welsh rugby union players
Wales international rugby union players
London Welsh RFC players
Bristol Bears players
Pontypool RFC players
Coventry R.F.C. players
Rugby union fly-halves